Isolation is the Gold-certified fifth studio album by Toto, released on October 18, 1984. Isolation is the first album to feature longtime bassist Mike Porcaro and the only album with Fergie Frederiksen as the primary vocalist. Isolation failed to achieve the popularity of its predecessor, Toto IV, although it achieved gold record status and gave the band their highest charting mainstream rock single "Stranger in Town" (No. 7). Relatively few songs from this album were featured in live performances after 1985's Isolation World Tour.

Background and recording
While Toto IV was a massive, Grammy winning success, Toto elected not to mount a U.S. tour behind the album, a decision Steve Lukather has since regretted as a missed opportunity to become a "US-arena rock band." Part of the reluctance to tour was the ongoing personal and legal drug-related problems of lead vocalist Bobby Kimball. As the band began sessions for Isolation, Kimball reportedly struggled badly with his vocals. While Kimball would argue in later years that he sang lead on all the tracks on the album, Lukather has stated that he only recorded one lead vocal, for the track "Lion." Even that reportedly required weeks of work, primarily because of Kimball's tendency to not show up for sessions and, when he did, to struggle with the vocals which were at the top of his range. Ultimately, Jeff Porcaro fired Kimball from the band.

The fact the band used multiple lead vocalists on their songs, including David Paich and Lukather, mitigated some of the impact of losing their primary lead vocalist. Nonetheless, it was a significant change for the band. Over the course of the next year, Toto would focus on other projects, notably the soundtrack for the film Dune. The commercial failure of Dune served only to add insult to the injury of having lost their lead vocalist.

When the band finally began auditioning potential lead vocalists, the job was first offered to Richard Page, who ultimately declined the offer because he had a contract for his band, Mr. Mister. Lukather then wanted to offer the job to Eric Martin, later of Mr. Big, but Porcaro was interested in Fergie Frederiksen, then lead singer of the band LeRoux. The gig went to Frederiksen, who contributed not only vocals to Isolation, but co-wrote the tracks "Angel Don't Cry," "Isolation," "Mr. Friendly," and "Change of Heart."

The first cover design for Isolation was done by David Lynch, with whom Toto had worked on Dune. Though the band reportedly spent $25,000 on the work, they were ultimately disappointed in it and did not use it. The surreal image that became the cover of Isolation was ultimately chosen by Jeff Porcaro.

While the band was proud of the finished album, Lukather has noted that it was clear Isolation did not "sound like the work of the same band that had made Toto IV." Toto wanted to release the track "Endless," on which Frederiksen sang lead, as the first single. However, Columbia Records opted for "Stranger in Town," sung by David Paich and thought to be more similar to the hit "Africa." While "Stranger in Town" was a Top 30 hit, it was a disappointment compared to the chart topping success of the singles from Toto IV.  
The promo music video (featuring actor Brad Dourif) for the track was, however, nominated for MTV Video of the Year.

The tour behind Isolation was disastrous; Toto had been booked into arenas based on the success of Toto IV, the 10,000-seat venues were sparsely attended and, according to Lukather, the band "lost their shirts" on the tour. A tour of Europe was ultimately cancelled and Toto fired their booking agents.

Isolation would eventually achieve gold status in the United States and triple platinum status in Japan, but was nonetheless seen as a commercial failure. Although Frederiksen would begin work with Toto on their sixth album, Fahrenheit, he struggled with the vocals for the first track, "Could This Be Love," and the band moved on to Joseph Williams.

Reception

AllMusic's retrospective review praised the performances of Jeff Porcaro, David Paich, and Steve Lukather in passing but dismissed Isolation as "a Journey clone album, minus the aching ballads that had made Journey such a success."

Track listing

Personnel 
Toto
 Fergie Frederiksen – lead vocals , backing vocals
 Steve Lukather – guitars, backing vocals, lead vocals 
 David Paich – keyboards, backing vocals, lead vocals , orchestral arrangements 
 Steve Porcaro – keyboards, electronic sounds
 Mike Porcaro – bass
 Jeff Porcaro – drums, percussion

Additional musicians
 Mike Cotten – additional synthesizers 
 Lenny Castro – congas, percussion
 Joe Porcaro – percussion
 Tom Scott – saxophones
 Chuck Findley – trumpet
 Jerry Hey – trumpet, horn arrangements 
 James Newton Howard – orchestral arrangements and conductor 
 Marty Paich – conductor 
 The London Symphony Orchestra – strings 
 Bobby Kimball – recorded but scrapped lead vocals , backing vocals 
 Gene Morford – bass vocal 
 Tom Kelly – backing vocals 
 Richard Page – backing vocals

Production 
 Produced by Toto
 Engineers – Niko Bolas, Tom Knox, Greg Ladanyi and Shep Lonsdale.
 Assistant Engineers – Richard Bosworth, Ann Calnan, Terry Christian, Tom Fletcher, Stuart Furusho, Bill Jackson, Brian Malouf, Peggy McCreary, Franz Pusch, David Schober and Duane Seykora.
 Strings engineered by John Kurlander
 Mixed by Greg Ladanyi and Toto
 Mastered by Doug Sax at The Mastering Lab (Los Angeles, CA).
 Art Direction and Design – Bill Murphy
 Illustration – Robert Kopecky
 Photography – Raul Vega

Additional notes
Catalogue: (LP) Columbia 9C9-39911, (CD) Columbia CK-38962

Charts

Weekly charts

Year-end charts

Certifications

References

Toto (band) albums
1984 albums
Columbia Records albums
Albums recorded at Sunset Sound Recorders
Albums recorded at United Western Recorders